Prayogshala is a book about the politics of Nepal. It was written by Sudheer Sharma. The book revolves around the Maoist insurgency, deposed monarchy and the role of New Delhi in Nepal's period of political transition. It was published by Fine Print. The book was translated and updated as The Nepal Nexus and published on 2019.

See also 

 The Nepal Nexus
 All Roads Lead North
 Unleashing Nepal

References

Political books
Nepalese books
2013 non-fiction books
21st-century Nepalese books
Works about the Nepalese Civil War
Nepalese non-fiction books
Nepalese non-fiction literature
Nepali-language books